AWARE (Americans Well-informed on Automobile Retailing Economics) is a national nonprofit organization that was formed in 2005 to enhance consumer understanding of the vehicle financing process.

Background 
AWARE is focused exclusively on auto financing education for students and adults.  It provides free educational resources (including curriculum, calculators and worksheets, and brochures and wallet cards in English and Spanish) to K-12 educators and organizations interested in increasing consumer understanding of auto loans and leases. 

AWARE is supported by the National Automobile Dealers Association (NADA), the American Financial Services Association (AFSA), the National Association of Minority Automobile Dealers (NAMAD), the American International Automobile Dealers Association, Ally Financial, American Honda Finance Corporation, American Suzuki Financial Services, AutoNation, Ford Motor Credit Company, Group 1 Automotive, Inc.,  Lithia Motors, National Auto Finance Company, Nissan Motor Acceptance Corporation, Sonic Automotive Inc., Toyota Financial Services, United Auto Group, Inc., and Wells Fargo Auto Finance.

References

External links 
• AWARE (http://www.AutoFinancing101.org)

Organizations established in 2005
Non-profit organizations based in Washington, D.C.